Waheeba Faree is a Yemeni politician and a former Minister in the Cabinet of Yemen. She was appointed head of the newly formed Ministry of State for Human Rights in 2001, becoming the country's first female minister.

</ref>

She established Queen Arwa University, the first private university in Yemen, in 1996 She currently works as a businesswoman. Professor of Educational Planning and Development, Foundations of  Education and Administration, Former head of Board of Queen Arwa University. Chairperson of Dialogue and Development forum.

Memberships
Is a Member Staff of Sana’a University, Queen Arwa University and National Institute Of public Administration, Advisor of many Yemeni NGO's and GOs, Consultant of many International Organizations of Education, HDR, HR, Public Administration, Higher Commission of Human Rights and The National Council of Civil Services.

Most important jobs and positions held
Since 1987 she has been working as a Lecturer of Education (Sociology, Philosophy, Planning, and Administration at Sana’a University. Head of many Yemeni institutions Women's Educational Department 1976, YILI 1989, Faculty of Education Sana’a University1992, Higher Education1990, Women Studies Center at Sana’a University 1992, Founder Queen Arwa University in 1996. In 2001-2004 she was nominated as a first Yemeni woman Minister of State of Human Rights, and In 2007 was nominated as a General Director of (NIAS) National Institute of Administrative Sciences, Yemen.
She Participated, Organized many Seminars and Workshops on Development, Women's Education, Public Administration, and some other political and social activities.
Orthant conferences organized and hosted
Non-govern The most impmental Conference in Higher Education QAU, Sanaa, 2000.
The Seventh National Conference of Administrative leadership in Yemen, NIAS, Sanaa 2008
The Academic Supportive Conference in Comprehensive National Dialogue, Queen Arwa University, Sanaa 2013
Dialogue and Development forum  2014
Publications
Basic Education in Yemen According to the Social Needs and New Trends, Sanaa, 1987.
Girl's Education in Yemen, between Reluctance and Equal Educational Opportunities 1983.
Working Children in Yemen field study, Sana’a, 1997
Women's Socio /Economic Participation in Yemen, Sana’a, 1999
Administration Between Theory and Practice in Yemen, Sana’a,2009
Women's Participation in Social Economical Development in Yemen, 2010
Many news articles covering various subjects (1983-2014).

See also
Human rights in Yemen

References

Living people
Human rights ministers of Yemen
Women government ministers of Yemen
21st-century Yemeni politicians
21st-century Yemeni women politicians
1956 births